Kostis is a hypocorism of the Greek name Konstantinos (Constantine). Notable people with the name include:

Given name
Kostis Adosidis Pasha (1818–1895), Prince of Samos
Kostis Chatzidakis (born 1965), Greek politician 
Kostis Gimossoulis (born 1960), Greek poet and novelist
Costis Gontikas (born 1994), Greek professional basketball player
Kostis Gontikas (born 1934), Greek politician
Kostis Palamas (1859–1943), Greek poet
Kostis Papagiorgis (1947–2014), Greek essayist, columnist, translator of philosophical studies
Kostis Protopapas, American opera artistic director of Greek origin
Konstantinos "Kostis" Stephanopoulos (1926–2016), Greek conservative politician who served as President of Greece from 1995 to 2005

Surname
Christos Kostis (born 1972), Greek football (soccer) player
Peter Kostis (born 1946), American golf analyst and instructor
Tasos Kostis (born 1951), Greek actor

See also
Costi (disambiguation)
Kosti (disambiguation)
Kostas (disambiguation)

Greek masculine given names